Undifferentiated embryonic cell transcription factor 1 is a protein in humans that is encoded by the UTF1 gene.
 UTF1, first reported in 1998, is expressed in pluripotent cells including embryonic stem cells and embryonic carcinoma cells. Its expression is rapidly reduced upon differentiation. UTF1 protein is localized to the cell nucleus, where it functions to regulate the pluripotent chromatin state and buffer mRNA levels by promoting degradation of mRNA.

Aberrant expression of UTF1 has also been reported in cervical cancer cells, where the UTF1 gene promoter loses methylation and becomes abnormally expressed compared to normal cervical cells.

In rat testis, UTF1 expression is limited to a subpopulation of early type A spermatogonia. Further, in adult human testis, UTF1 gene and protein expression has been shown to be restricted to the earliest state of spermatogonium.

References

Further reading